Allium thunbergii, Thunberg's chive or Thunberg garlic, is an East Asian species of wild onion native to Japan (incl Bonin + Ryukyu Islands), Korea, and China (incl. Taiwan). It grows at elevations up to 3000 m. The Flora of China recognizes A. tunbergii and A. stenodon as separate species, but more recent sources combine the two.

Allium thunbergii produces one or two egg-shaped bulbs up to 20 mm in diameter. Scapes are up to 50 cm tall. Leaves are longer than the scape, hollow, triangular in cross-section. Umbels are crowded with many red or purple flowers.

The specific epithet thunbergii references the Swedish botanist Carl Peter Thunberg.

This plant has gained the Royal Horticultural Society’s Award of Garden Merit.

Varieties
 Allium thunbergii var. deltoides (S.O.Yu, S.Lee & W.T.Lee) H.J.Choi & B.U.Oh - Gayasan National Park in Korea
 Allium thunbergii var. teretifolium H.J.Choi & B.U.Oh - Korea
 Allium thunbergii var. thunbergii - China, Japan, Korea

References

Bibliography 

 

thunbergii
Onions
Flora of China
Flora of Eastern Asia
Plants described in 1827